Zechariah ( Zəḵaryāh, "remember Yah"; ; Zacharias in KJV; Zachary in the Douay–Rheims Bible; Zakariyya in Islamic tradition) is a figure in the New Testament and the Quran, and venerated in Christianity and Islam. In the Bible he is the father of John the Baptist, a priest of the sons of Aaron in the Gospel of Luke, and the husband of Elizabeth who is a relative of the Virgin Mary.

Biblical account

According to the Gospel of Luke, during the reign of king Herod, there was a priest named Zechariah, of the course of Abia, whose wife Elizabeth was also of the priestly family of Aaron. The evangelist states that both the parents were righteous before God, since they were "blameless" in observing the commandments and ordinances of the Lord. When the events related in Luke began, their marriage was still childless, because Elizabeth was "barren", and they were both "well advanced in years".

The duties at the temple in Jerusalem alternated between each of the family lines that had descended from those appointed by king David. Luke states that during the week when it was the duty of Zechariah's family line to serve at "the temple of the Lord", the lot for performing the incense offering had fallen to Zechariah.

The Gospel of Luke states that while Zechariah ministered at the altar of incense, an angel of the Lord appeared and announced to him that his wife would give birth to a son, whom he was to name John, and that this son would be the forerunner of the Lord. Citing their advanced age, Zechariah asked with disbelief for a sign whereby he would know the truth of this prophecy. In reply, the angel identified himself as Gabriel, sent especially by God to make this announcement, and added that because of Zechariah's doubt he would be struck dumb and "not able to speak, until the day that these things shall be performed". Consequently, when he went out to the waiting worshippers in the temple's outer courts, he was unable to speak the customary blessing.

After returning to his house in "Hebron, in the hill country of Judah", his wife Elizabeth conceived. After Elizabeth completed her fifth month of pregnancy, her relative Mary was visited by the same angel, Gabriel. While still a virgin, Gabriel said to her, "Do not be afraid, Mary; you have found favor with God. You will conceive and give birth to a son, and you are to call him Jesus. 'How will this be,' Mary asked the angel, 'since I am a virgin?' The angel answered, 'The Holy Spirit will come on you, and the power of the Most High will overshadow you. So the holy one to be born will be called the Son of God.'" Joseph, to whom Mary was betrothed, found out that she was pregnant, obviously disturbing news. Because he "was faithful to the law, and yet did not want to expose her to public disgrace, he had in mind to divorce her quietly. But after he had considered this, an angel of the Lord appeared to him in a dream and said, 'Joseph son of David, do not be afraid to take Mary home as your wife, because what is conceived in her is from the Holy Spirit. She will give birth to a son, and you are to give him the name Jesus, because he will save his people from their sins.' 24 When Joseph woke up, he did what the angel of the Lord had commanded him and took Mary home as his wife."

Mary then traveled to visit her relative Elizabeth, having been told by the angel that Elizabeth was in her sixth month of pregnancy. Mary remained about three months before she returned to her own house.

Elizabeth gave birth, and on the eighth day, when their son was to be circumcised according to the commandment, her neighbours and relatives assumed that he was to be named after his father. Elizabeth, however, insisted that his name was to be John; so the family then questioned her husband. As soon as Zechariah had written on a writing table: "His name is John", he regained the power of speech, and blessed "the Lord God of Israel" with a prophecy known as the Benedictus or "Song of Zechariah".

The child grew up and "waxed strong in spirit", but remained in the deserts of Judæa until he assumed the ministry that was to earn him the name "John the Baptist" (Matthew 3:1).

Other Christian traditions

Identification with Zechariah from Matthew

Death

The Gospel of James, a 2nd-century apocryphal work, recounts that, at the time of the massacre of the Innocents, when King Herod ordered the slaughter of all males under the age of two in an attempt to prevent the prophesied Messiah from coming to Israel, Zechariah refused to divulge the whereabouts of his son (who was in hiding), and he was therefore murdered by Herod's soldiers. This account is also present in subsequent Eastern Orthodox tradition.

Commemoration
The Catholic Church commemorates him as a saint, along with Elizabeth, on September 23rd as it is believed that his temple duty before John the Baptist's conception took place on the Day of Atonement. He is also venerated as a prophet in the Calendar of Saints of the Lutheran Church on 5 September. The Eastern Orthodox Church also celebrates the feast day of Zechariah on September 5, together with Elizabeth, who is considered a matriarch. Zechariah and Elizabeth are invoked in several prayers during the Orthodox Mystery of Crowning (Sacrament of Marriage), as the priest blesses the newly married couple, saying "Thou who didst... accept Zechariah and Elizabeth, and didst make their offspring the Forerunner..." and "...bless them, O Lord our God, as Thou didst Zechariah and Elizabeth...". In the Greek Orthodox calendar, Zechariah and Elizabeth are also commemorated on June 24.

Relics veneration
The Church of San Zaccaria in Venice, Italy claims to house the relics of Zechariah, entombed alongside those of Saint Athanasius of Alexandria.   Armenians believe that the Gandzasar Monastery in Nagorno Karabakh, Azerbaijan contains his relics; however, his relics were also kept in the Great Church of Constantinople, where they were brought by the praefectus urbi Ursus on 4 September, 415.

His relics uncovering is commemorated by Greek Orthodox Church on 11 February, and translation of his relics is commemorated on 1 December.

Tomb venerated in Byzantine period

In 2003, a 4th-century inscription on the so-called Tomb of Absalom, a 1st-century monument in Jerusalem, was deciphered as, "This is the tomb of Zachariah, the martyr, the holy priest, the father of John." This suggests to some scholars that it is the burial place of Zechariah the father of John the Baptist. Professor Gideon Foerster at the Hebrew University states that the inscription tallies with a 6th-century Christian text by a pilgrim named Theodosius which states that Zechariah was buried with Simon the Elder and James the brother of Jesus, and believes that both are authentic. Zias and Puech suggest the inscription may refer to another 'Zekariah' mentioned by Josephus and the Talmud who was martyred in the time of Vespasian. They also suggest the inscription casts doubt on the tomb being Absalom's. Although it was referred to as such in the 1st century, Absalom had lived centuries earlier.

In Islam 

Zechariah (Arabic: زكريا Zakariyya) is also a prophet in Islam, and is mentioned in the Qur'an as the father of Yaḥyā (John the Baptist). Zechariah is also believed by some Muslims to have been a martyr. An old tradition narrates that Zechariah was sawn in half, in a death which resembles that attributed to Isaiah in Lives of the Prophets.

See also
Biblical narratives and the Qur'an
Qiṣaṣ al-'Anbiyā’ (Stories of the Prophets (in Islam))

References

External links

Prophet Zachariah the father of St John the Baptist Orthodox icon and synaxarion

1st-century BCE Jews
1st-century BC clergy
Angelic visionaries
Gospel of Luke
Jewish priests
People in the canonical gospels
Prophets of the New Testament
Roman-era Jews
Saints from the Holy Land
Christian saints from the New Testament
Massacre of the Innocents
1st-century BC Christian saints
New Testament people in Mandaeism